The Devonshire manuscript (British Library, Add. MS 17492) is a verse miscellany from the 1530s and early 1540s, compiled by three women who attended the court of Anne Boleyn: Mary Shelton, Mary Fitzroy (née Howard), and Lady Margaret Douglas. Although the manuscript contains a number of original compositions, transcriptions, fragments and extracts of verse (including some from the medieval poets Geoffrey Chaucer, Thomas Hoccleve, and Richard Roos), the majority of the verses recorded are those composed by Sir Thomas Wyatt, of which many are unique to the manuscript. As such, it is not only an important witness in the Canon of Wyatt's poetry, but also an artefact that reveals much about the role of women in literary production and manuscript circulation in the early Tudor period.

References

16th century in England
British poetry collections